The Grand Hotel du Boulevard is a hotel in Bucharest, Romania, at the intersection of Calea Victoriei and .

It first opened in 1873 as Hotel Herdan, and changed to its current name in 1877. The Grand Hotel du Boulevard is a Romanian historic monument.

References 

Hotels in Bucharest
Historic monuments in Bucharest